Christian Gregorio Poveda Ruiz (January 12, 1957 – September 2, 2009), known as Christian Poveda, was a Hispanic-French photojournalist and film director. He covered the world's conflict zones for more than 30 years. Poveda's documentary film  (2008) is about two rival gangs in El Salvador.

Life
Born to exiled Spanish parents in Algeria, he went to France with his family in 1961/2.

La Vida Loca
La Vida Loca (The Crazy Life, 2008) is a documentary filmed by Poveda in El Salvador about the life of local gangs.

For 16 months Poveda filmed the marginal young people of El Salvador divided between two rival gangs, the Mara Salvatrucha and the 18th Street gang.

The hand-held camera focuses on daily life in a base cell of one of the gigantic maras, the la Campanera X-18 clique, composed of fifty engaging adolescents and young adults with an average age of 16 to 18.

The documentary was presented in the San Sebastián International Film Festival in September 2008.

Death
Poveda was shot to death in Tonacatepeque, El Salvador on September 2, 2009; probably by a member of a mara. He was 52 years old.

It is alleged that certain police and gang members were unhappy with Poveda's documentary. He had promised his subjects that La Vida Loca would not be released in El Salvador, but he was powerless to prevent pirated copies from being sold. In 2011, ten gang members and a former police officer were convicted and sent to prison for Poveda's death.

French Foreign Minister Bernard Kouchner praised Poveda's work, calling him "a respected journalist, a professional who never hesitated to take great risks in the name of freedom of information." Salvadoran Public Safety Minister Manuel Melgar said Poveda's killing was a "repugnant and reproachable criminal act".

See also
List of unsolved murders

References

External links
Poveda's profile at Agence Vu
 
 La Vida Loca official site

1955 births
2000s murders in El Salvador
2009 crimes in El Salvador
2009 deaths
2009 murders in North America
Assassinated French journalists
Deaths by firearm in El Salvador
French people murdered abroad
French people of Spanish descent
People murdered in El Salvador
Unsolved murders in El Salvador